Jobab ben Zerah ( Yōḇāḇ ben-Zerah) was a king of ancient Edom, according to Genesis 36. He succeeded Bela ben Beor in the apparently elective kingship of the Edomites. He ruled from Bozrah. He was succeeded by Husham.

Jobab has traditionally often been identified with the biblical figure Job. Job was said to live in the "land of Uz", which was where Edom was located. Job was one of the wealthiest people in the world, and this wealth could easily be explained with his status as royalty.

Identity as Job
The Greek translation of the Hebrew Bible, the Septuagint, identifies Job as Jobab. Also, the oldest English-language Catholic Bible, the Douay-Rheims, identifies Job as Jobab. The Challoner Revision of the Douay-Rheims speculates that Job could have written the book of Job, but the original 1610 Douay-Rheims says that Job himself wrote the book in the Arabic language, which was then translated into Hebrew by Moses. 

Church Slavonic versions of Book of Job and Russian Synodal Bible include a postscript in which Jobab is identified with Job, the anonymous author of the postscript refers to a "Syriac book". Many Bible scholars, such as Douglas Wilson, agree with the identification, though Methodist theologian Adam Clarke maintained a different position. David J. Gibson in his book Whence Came the Hyksos, Kings of Egypt defends the identification based on numerous passages from the Book of Job, personal names, geography, occupation, and contemporaries.

External links 
 Kings of Egypt
Land of Edom
The Hyksos, Kings of Egypt and the land of Edom

References 

Kings of Edom
Job (biblical figure)
Book of Genesis people